The First Presbyterian Church in Lexington, Kentucky is a historic church at 171 Market Street.  The church was designed by the important Lexington architect Cincinnatus Shryock who was also an elder at First Church.   

The original congregational name was the Mount Zion Church, founded in 1784, making it one of the oldest churches in Lexington, KY. The name was changed when they moved to the present day building in 1874.

It was added to the National Register of Historic Places in 1974.

Architecture
Cincinnatus Shryock grated college at Transylvania University, located in Lexington, KY. His family is famous for their architecture in Kentucky. One of the most famous buildings done in his family was by Gideon of the Old State Capital building in Frankfort, KY.

The First Presbyterian Church has a gothic style with a large tower in the front made with a copper spire. It also includes stained glass throughout the tall tower and around the rest of the building. At the time it as created, it was an important piece of architecture in the Lexington skyline.

See also
National Register of Historic Places listings in Kentucky

References

External links
Official website

19th-century Presbyterian church buildings in the United States
Churches in Lexington, Kentucky
Gothic Revival church buildings in Kentucky
National Register of Historic Places in Lexington, Kentucky
Presbyterian churches in Kentucky
Churches completed in 1874
1874 establishments in Kentucky